The following highways are numbered 300:

Australia
  Midland Highway (Victoria)
 Melba Highway (Victoria)

Canada
Manitoba Provincial Road 300

Japan
 Japan National Route 300

Korea, South
 Daejeon Southern Ring Expressway

Turkey 
 , a west-east state road in Turkey running from Çeşme, İzmir Province to Kapıköy at the Iranian border.

United States
  Arkansas Highway 300
  Colorado State Highway 300
  Delaware Route 300
  Florida State Road 300
 Georgia:
  Georgia State Route 300
  Georgia State Route 300 Connector
  Georgia State Route 300 (former)
  Iowa Highway 300 (former)
  Kentucky Route 300
  Louisiana Highway 300
  Maryland Route 300
  Minnesota State Highway 300
  Montana Secondary Highway 300
  New Jersey Route 300 (former)
  New Mexico State Road 300
  New York State Route 300
  Ohio State Route 300
 Pennsylvania Route 300 (official designation for Pennsylvania Route 283)
  Puerto Rico Highway 300
  South Carolina Highway 300
  Tennessee State Route 300 (unsigned)
 Texas:
  Texas State Highway 300
  Texas State Highway Spur 300
  Farm to Market Road 300
  Utah State Route 300 (former)
  Virginia State Route 300
  Washington State Route 300